The Roman Catholic Diocese of Piracicaba is a diocese located in the city of Piracicaba in the Ecclesiastical province of Campinas in Brazil.

History
 February 26, 1944: Established as Diocese of Piracicaba from Diocese of Campinas

Bishops
 Bishops of Piracicaba (Roman rite):, in reverse chronological order
 Bishop Fernando Mason, O.F.M. Conv. (2005.05.25 – present)
 Bishop Moacyr José Vitti, C.S.S. (2002.05.15 – 2004.05.19), appointed Archbishop of Curitiba, Parana
 Bishop Eduardo Koaik (1984.01.11 – 2002.05.15)
 Bishop Aniger de Francisco de Maria Melillo (1960.05.29 – 1984.01.11)
 Bishop Ernesto de Paula (1945.06.30 – 1960.01.09)

Coadjutor bishop
Eduardo Koaik (1979-1984)

References

Roman Catholic dioceses in Brazil
Piracicaba, Roman Catholic Diocese of
Christian organizations established in 1944
Roman Catholic dioceses and prelatures established in the 20th century